The Dark Side of the Moon Tour was a concert tour by British rock band Pink Floyd in 1972 and 1973 in support of their album The Dark Side of the Moon, covering the UK, US, Europe and Japan. There were two separate legs promoting the album, one in 1972 before the album's release and another in 1973 afterwards, together covering 128 shows.

Pink Floyd had worked out a basic structure of Dark Side of the Moon in late 1971, and played it at almost every gig the following year, alongside a set of earlier live favourites. Various changes to the structure were made throughout this time, as songs were tightened up and arrangements changed. By 1973, the album was finished and the live performance resembled the completed work. To re-create it in concert, the group added saxophonist Dick Parry and female backing singers to the show. The stage performance was enhanced with extra visual effects and an improved quadrophonic sound system. The success of Dark Side of the Moon and the US top 20 hit "Money" greatly increased Pink Floyd's profile and they began to play sell-out stadium shows, though the audience changed from being one that would quietly listen to one that just wanted to dance and hear hit songs.

1972 

Pink Floyd planned their first UK wide tour since 1969 for the start of 1972. They were worried that their stage show was becoming stale, and decided they needed a new piece of music for the upcoming tour. Shortly after the release of the album Meddle, the group booked Decca Studios, Hampstead from 29 November – 10 December 1971 to write new material that would form part of a stage show. The group booked a warehouse owned by the Rolling Stones in Bermondsey to rehearse the new suite of music, followed by a dress rehearsal at the Rainbow Theatre, London, where they tested a new Watkins Electric Music PA system designed by Bill Kelsey, which had a complete quadrophonic sound system. The group hired lighting engineer Arthur Max, who they had met two years earlier playing at the Fillmore West, San Francisco, to design a new rig for the tour.

Playing 89 shows in 1972, the most until 1994, Pink Floyd debuted the new suite live on 20 January at the Brighton Dome. Partway through, when playing "Money", a lack of power led to the backing tape slowing down and going out of time, causing the group to stop. After a break, they came back and played "Atom Heart Mother" instead. The first complete performance was the following day at the Portsmouth Guildhall. At the Free Trade Hall, Manchester, the power failed 25 minutes into the show, and the rest of the concert was abandoned. Two extra shows were booked on 29 and 30 March to make up for this.

The title of the suite was changed to  Eclipse after it was discovered that Medicine Head had released an album with the same name, then Dark Side of the Moon – A Piece for Assorted Lunatics, the name under which it made its press debut in February 1972. The title changed for the first part of the US tour to Eclipse (A Piece for Assorted Lunatics) during April and May before reverting to Dark Side of the Moon – A Piece for Assorted Lunatics at the end of September for the second part of the US tour, and finally released in 1973 as The Dark Side of the Moon.

Dark Side of the Moon was performed differently to the finished album, and evolved over the year. Although Pink Floyd had previously rehearsed material before recording it, taking it on tour first allowed the piece to be improved and strengthened. They also knew that their audience were happy to sit patiently and listen to the group, which gave them the confidence to play over 40 minutes of new material they had not heard. "On the Run", whose working title was "The Travel Sequence", was at first a guitar and keyboard jam and would remain so for the rest of the year's performances. "Time" was played at a slower speed, and the line "Lying supine in the sunshine" was sung instead of "Tired of lying in the sunshine". "The Great Gig in the Sky", whose working title was "Religion" or "The Mortality Sequence", originally consisted of an organ solo and various tapes of "preachers" either preaching or reading from such passages as from Chapter 5, Verse 13 of Ephesians, a book of the Bible, or reciting the Lord's Prayer, including soundbites from broadcaster Malcolm Muggeridge. Initially, the suite ended with "Brain Damage". Roger Waters felt there needed to be a suitable ending, and wrote "Eclipse" as a finale. It made its debut at a gig at De Montfort Hall, Leicester on 10 February.

The first London performance, and the first to the press was on 17 February 1972 at the Rainbow Theatre, where the band played for four consecutive nights, following which the group took a break from touring to work on the soundtrack album Obscured By Clouds. A bootleg recording of the concerts was released and sold 100,000 copies, annoying the band as it was still a work in progress. The tour then moved to Japan for five shows, and then to the US and Europe. The group headlined the British Rock Meeting festival at Germersheim, West Germany on 21 May and the Amsterdam Rock Circus at the Olympic Stadium, playing "Atom Heart Mother" instead of Dark Side of the Moon.

Following the European shows, recording began on The Dark Side of the Moon on 24 May, beginning with basic backing tracks derived from the live versions. As a replacement for the first Brighton Dome show which was abandoned during Dark Side of the Moon, Pink Floyd gave two concerts at the venue on 28 and 29 June. The latter show was filmed by Peter Clifton for inclusion on his film Sounds of the City. Clips of these were occasionally aired on television and the performance of "Careful with That Axe, Eugene" was on the various artists video Superstars in Concert.

The tour moved to the US in September. Engineer Alan Parsons was asked to run the front of house sound, setting a trend for Pink Floyd inviting studio personnel out on tour. Richard Wright had now written the piano music to "The Great Gig in the Sky", replacing the earlier "Mortality Suite" piece, and it was performed in the arrangement per the finished album, without vocals. On 22 September, the group played the Hollywood Bowl, which featured eight powered searchlights beaming rays from behind the Bowl's amphitheatre. They then played two dates at the Winterland Ballroom, San Francisco on 23 and 24 September. The group returned to the UK to play a sell-out charity show at the Empire Pool, Wembley on 21 October, supporting War on Want and Save the Children. This was followed by shows in Europe to the end of the year, with the final date at the Palais de Sports, Lyon on 10 December. By then, Dark Side of the Moon sounded close to the final album, except without any female vocals or saxophone, which would follow the next year.

Set list 

First set – Dark Side of the Moon – A Piece for Assorted Lunatics or sometimes Eclipse – A Piece for Assorted Lunatics (except 21–22 May)

"Speak to Me"
"Breathe"
"The Travel Sequence" (precursor to "On the Run")
"Time"
"The Mortality Sequence" (early version of "The Great Gig in the Sky" without female vocals)
"Money"
"Us and Them"
"Scat" (early version of "Any Colour You Like")
"Brain Damage"
"Eclipse" (after 10 February)

Second set

"One of These Days"
"Careful with That Axe, Eugene" (sometimes not performed)
"Set the Controls for the Heart of the Sun" (sometimes as an encore)
"Atom Heart Mother" (20 January, 6 March, 16 April, 21–22 May)
"Echoes" (occasionally as an encore)

Encore (when played):

"A Saucerful of Secrets" (occasional, until 22 September)
"Blues" (occasional)
"Childhood's End" (1 and 9 December)

Roland Petit Ballet shows
In November 1972, during the middle of the tour's European leg, and again in January 1973, Pink Floyd performed with the Roland Petit Ballet. The set list for which their portion of the ballet was choreographed to was "One of These Days", "Careful with That Axe, Eugene", "Obscured by Clouds", "When You're In" and "Echoes". Some of the 1973 shows only featured the ballet playing to pre-recorded tracks, as the group were trying to finish recording The Dark Side of the Moon at this time. One of the last pieces to be recorded was Clare Torry's lead vocal on "Great Gig in the Sky" on 21 January during this run.

1973 

Following the Roland Petit shows and the completion of the album, Pink Floyd booked further rehearsal time at the Rainbow Theatre from 19 to 21 February 1973 for an enhanced stage show based on the final recordings. Dark Side of the Moon was moved from the start of the show to the end of the main set. For the first time, the group took additional musicians with them; saxophonist Dick Parry (an old childhood friend of David Gilmour) and three female backing vocalists who had been touring with Leon Russell. The tour began in Madison, Wisconsin on 4 March. On 17 March, they performed at Radio City Music Hall, New York City at 1am, being transported onto stage from one of the elevators surrounded by dry ice, which drew strong press reviews. The show made use of a 20-speaker quadrophonic sound system.

Following the US tour, the band played two nights at Earl's Court on 18 and 19 May. In "Set the Controls for the Heart of the Sun", a gong played by Waters was lit up with flames. During Dark Side of the Moon, a  plane crashed into the stage at the end of "On the Run".

The group returned to the US in June. Dark Side of the Moon had now topped the Billboard charts, and the single "Money" had become a top 20 hit. Having previously played halls and theatres, the tour now covered stadiums for the first time. Although all the shows sold out, the audience now included people who wanted to hear the hit singles and "boogie", in sharp contrast to earlier audiences who were happy to listen to whatever music Pink Floyd were playing. The tour closed with two European shows in October.

On 4 November 1973, Pink Floyd played two charity shows at London's Rainbow Theatre as a benefit for Robert Wyatt, formerly the drummer of UFO Club contemporaries Soft Machine, who had become paralysed after falling out of a window. The concerts raised a reported £10,000 for Wyatt. Clare Torry sung her vocal to "The Great Gig in the Sky" as it had appeared on the album. Pink Floyd then took a lengthy break from touring and did not play any further shows until June 1974.

Set list 

First set

"Obscured By Clouds"
"When You're In"
"Childhood's End" (6–10 March)
"Set the Controls for the Heart of the Sun" (11 March onwards)
"Careful with That Axe, Eugene"
"Echoes" (opening number from 4–12 March)

Second set – The Dark Side of the Moon

"Speak to Me"
"Breathe"
"On the Run"
"Time"/"Breathe (Reprise)"
"The Great Gig in the Sky"
"Money"
"Us and Them"
"Any Colour You Like"
"Brain Damage"
"Eclipse"

Encore:

 "One of These Days"

Tour dates

1972

1973

Cancelled shows 

Source : Povey 2006 pp. 164–179

Personnel
Pink Floyd
David Gilmour – guitar, vocals
Roger Waters – bass, vocals
Richard Wright – keyboards, vocals
Nick Mason – drums

Additional musicians
Dick Parry – saxophone (1973)
 Nawasa Crowder, Mary Ann Lindsey, Phyllis Lindsey – backing vocals (March – June 1973)
 Blackberries (Billy Barnum, Venetta Fields, Clydie King) – backing vocals (October 1973)
 Vicki Brown, Liza Strike, Clare Torry – backing vocals ("A Benefit for Robert Wyatt", 4 November 1973)

Additional personnel

1972
 Chris Adamson, Seth Goldman, Bobby Richardson, Brian Scott – technician / stage crew
 Mick "The Pole" Kluczynski – tour manager
 Arthur Max – lighting technician
 Chris Mickie – front of house sound
 Peter Watts – head of PA

1973
 Chris Adamson, Robbie Williams – PA and stage technician
 Mick "The Pole" Kluczynski – tour manager
 Arthur Max – Production manager and lighting technician
 Robin Murray – Lighting technician
 Alan Parsons – front of house sound
 Peter Watts – head of PA

Notes

References 

Sources

External links
1972 and 1973 dates – brain-damage.co.uk
Pink Floyd Archives

Pink Floyd concert tours
1972 concert tours
1973 concert tours